Peter Joseph Ward (1 November 1891 – 6 January 1970) was an Irish Sinn Féin (later Cumann na nGaedheal) politician who served as a Teachta Dála (TD) in the Dáil Éireann from 1919 to 1924.

Ward was born Faiafannan, County Donegal on 1 November 1891 and was the son of schoolteacher John Ward and Anne Byrne. 

He was elected at the 1918 general election as a Sinn Féin candidate in the Donegal South constituency. As with the other Sinn Féin MPs, he did not take his seat in the British House of Commons, sitting instead in the revolutionary First Dáil, which met in the Mansion House, Dublin in January, 1919.

He was elected in the 1921 general election to the House of Commons of Southern Ireland for the new Donegal constituency, but he and the other Sinn Féin members again declined to take their seats, sitting instead in the Second Dáil.

At the 1922 general election, he was returned to the Third Dáil as a pro-treaty Sinn Féin TD, and re-elected at the 1923 general election for the new Cumann na nGaedheal Party. He resigned his seat on 1 August 1924, and at the resulting by-election on 20 November 1924 was won by the Cumann na nGaedheal candidate Denis McCullough, who had been president of the Irish Republican Brotherhood (IRB) during the Easter Rising of 1916.

References

1891 births
1970 deaths
Cumann na nGaedheal TDs
Early Sinn Féin TDs
Members of the 1st Dáil
Members of the 2nd Dáil
Members of the 3rd Dáil
Members of the 4th Dáil
Members of the Parliament of the United Kingdom for County Donegal constituencies (1801–1922)
UK MPs 1918–1922
Politicians from County Donegal
People of the Irish Civil War (Pro-Treaty side)